Ala-Tilga  is a village in Rõuge Parish, Võru County in southeastern Estonia. The population has been  4 since 2021.

References

Villages in Võru County